Daniel Emmett Pender (17 March 1873 – 14 April 1968) was an Australian rules footballer who played with Carlton in the Victorian Football League (VFL).

Notes

External links 

Dan Pender's profile at Blueseum

1873 births
1968 deaths
Australian rules footballers from Melbourne
Carlton Football Club players
People from Williamstown, Victoria